Laura Cha Shih May-lung, GBM, GBS, JP (born 5 December 1949) is a Hong Kong businesswoman and politician. She is the Chairman of Hong Kong Stock Exchange and Non-Executive Deputy Chairman of The Hongkong and Shanghai Banking Corporation. She served as a non-official member of the Executive Council of Hong Kong from 2004 to 2022.

Early life and education 
On 5 December 1949, Cha was born in Shanghai, China. At age 2, Cha and her family moved to British Hong Kong.

Cha earned a Bachelor of Arts degree from the University of Wisconsin–Madison and a Juris Doctor degree from the Santa Clara University School of Law. She was a member of the Committee of 100, a Chinese American political and cultural organisation.

Career 
In 1983, Cha was admitted to the State Bar of California as Laura May-Lung Cha.
Cha practised law with Pillsbury Madison and Sutro, one of the powerful law firms in San Francisco, California. Since 1994, Cha no longer practices law in California.

After her return to Hong Kong, Cha continued practising law with Coudert Brothers. She worked at Hong Kong's Securities and Futures Commission from 1991 to early 2001, becoming its Deputy chairman in 1998. When she gave notice at the SFC in mid-2000, Cha was mulling a change and wanted to take things easier. Then came the CSRC's unexpected offer, which would make her the first overseas Chinese ever to hold vice ministerial rank in China's government. Though she had not worked in China before, Cha had established close relationships with senior CSRC executives over the years by working with them to list state-owned mainland companies on the Hong Kong stock exchange.

Cha served as Hong Kong's delegate to the 11th National People's Congress, Vice-Chairman of the International Advisory Council of the CSRC, Chairman of the University Grants Committee in Hong Kong, and a member of the advisory board of the Millstein Center of Corporate Governance and Performance at Yale University.

Cha was Vice-Chairman of the China Securities Regulatory Commission (CSRC) from 2001 to 2004. Cha was appointed to the post by the State Council of the People's Republic of China and became the first person outside mainland China to join the Central People's Government of the People's Republic of China at the vice-ministerial rank. Cha renounced US citizenship to take up the position.

In 2012, Cha was named an Honorary Fellow by the Hong Kong Securities and Investment Institute.

She has been a Non-Executive Director of Unilever since May 2013.

2014 Hong Kong protests controversy
Cha was reported by The Standard to have likened the pro-Occupy activists demand for democracy in the 2014 Hong Kong protests to the emancipation of African-American slaves at a conference at Paris, asking why Universal Suffrage "could not wait" for Hong Kongers in light of the historical disenfranchisement of African Americans. Her remarks were criticised on social media, with a petition to the board of directors of HSBC on Change.org stating that the signatories, "will not stand these remarks likening our rights to slavery, nor will we stand the kind of voter disenfranchisement her and her associates attempt to perpetrate on the Hong Kong public."

In response, Cha stated that she had in no way made any comparison of the Hong Kong protests to the emancipation of African American slaves. In her interview she had simply made the point that in every country, the electoral system and voting mechanisms evolved over time. It had done so in France, in the UK, in the United States and elsewhere. She further explained that the National Peoples' Congress decision of 31 August 2014 was the beginning of Hong Kong's journey to full democracy, and that Hong Kong should accept the package now... and improve upon it over time."

Personal life 
Cha is married and has two children. Cha's husband, Victor, is a prominent Hong Kong businessman. Cha renounced her United States citizenship prior to taking a position with China.

Awards and recognitions 
On 12 May 2011, Cha was an honored by Committee of 100 for her philanthropic contributions to higher education at the 20th Awards Gala in New York, U.S.

Cha was awarded the Grand Bauhinia Medal (GBM) by the Hong Kong SAR Government in 2017.

References

External links

The Hon. Laura Cha, GBS, JP
HKSI Hon Fellow Interview – Laura Cha
 Laura Cha Shin May-Lung Video produced by Makers: Women Who Make America
 Laura Cha's profile at HSBC

Living people
Delegates to the 11th National People's Congress from Hong Kong
Delegates to the 12th National People's Congress from Hong Kong
HSBC people
Hong Kong financial businesspeople
1949 births
People who renounced United States citizenship
California lawyers
Members of Committee of 100
University of Wisconsin–Madison alumni
Santa Clara University School of Law alumni
American women lawyers
American lawyers
Members of the Election Committee of Hong Kong, 2017–2021
Recipients of the Grand Bauhinia Medal
Recipients of the Gold Bauhinia Star
Recipients of the Silver Bauhinia Star